Nelson George Kraschel (October 27, 1889 – March 15, 1957) was an American politician of the Democratic Party. He was born on a farm near Macon, Illinois in 1889 and died in Harlan, Iowa in 1957.

In 1910 he moved to Harlan, Iowa to farm and raise livestock. Kraschel later became a livestock auctioneer and sold more than 50 million dollars of property. In 1932, he was placed on the Democratic Party ticket for Lieutenant Governor of Iowa as Clyde L. Herring's running mate. He won the election and was re-elected in 1934.  He was the 27th Governor of Iowa from 1937 to 1939.  Kraschel was an ardent supporter of Franklin D. Roosevelt, Henry A. Wallace, and the New Deal. He was also involved in other political campaigns, such as the Guy Gillette vs. Otha Wearin senatorial contest.

References

1889 births
1957 deaths
Democratic Party governors of Iowa
People from Macon County, Illinois
People from Harlan, Iowa
20th-century American politicians